Cyriocosmus perezmilesi otherwise known as the Bolivian dwarf beauty tarantula is a spider which was first described by Radan Kaderka in 2007. It was named in honor of Dr. Fernando Pérez-Miles, and is a fossorial tarantula. As its common name aptly states it is found in Bolivia.

Description 
Females live 15 years, while males live 5 to 6. Their carapace is a copper color, with a black opisthosoma with a heart shape urticating patch in the middle. With 8 vertical lines ranging from the bottom of the opisthosoma almost meeting the urticating patch. Their legs are a grey color, or a black depending.

Habitat 
They are found in the tropical areas of Bolivia, their type location being near the Beni River in the Beni Department. The average temperatures are 22 °C, with average yearly rainfall of 1,200mm, and an average height above sea level of 150m.

Behavior 
They are a very calm species, rarely throwing any urticating hairs, or making a threat pose. They are a fossorial species which enjoys to burrow, and they also web a fair bit, they are quite active and usually visible.

References 

Theraphosidae
Spiders described in 2007
Spiders of South America